Statistics of the  Cambodian League for the 1992 season.

Overview
Municipal Constructions won the championship.

References
RSSSF

C-League seasons
Cambodia
Cambodia
football